Sympistis ptah is a moth of the family Noctuidae first described by James T. Troubridge in 2008. It is found in the US state of New Mexico.

The wingspan is about 31 mm.

References

ptah
Moths described in 2008